The USF Juniors championship, also known as USF Juniors presented by Cooper Tires for sponsorship reasons, is an American auto racing series running with USF2000 cars (as of 2023). The series inaugurated in 2022 as a new first rung of the Road to Indy, below the USF2000 Championship. The series is owned by Andersen Promotions and sanctioned by USAC.

History
The USF Juniors championship was formally announced in September 2021. Series founder Dan Andersen cited the need for one more step on the Road to Indy ladder after karting due to the increasingly competitive nature of the previous first run, the USF2000 Championship as a primary factor for forming the series. He further established the want to provide "a true entry level series that is professionally managed where drivers, teams and parents can focus on training and racing via shorter, more economical events, while also lowering the spotlight on young drivers that often occurs on IndyCar race weekends." The series was also made as a direct competitor to the Formula 4 United States Championship. To allow champions of the series to progress in their careers, winners will receive a scholarship valued at $200,000. 

For the series' inaugural season, a six-event scheduled was planned featuring all road courses. USAC, who already handled duties for the USF2000 Championship and USF Pro 2000 championships in Road to Indy, was named the sanctioning body for the series. Former driver Gustavo Yacamán was hired as the series manager, while another two former drivers, Joel Miller and Johnny Unser, were hired as race stewards.

Cars
For the series' inaugural season, competitors will use a Ligier JS F4 chassis with a 160 hp 2.0 Liter engine made by Honda Performance Development (HPD). As with all other series in the Road to Indy ladder, The Goodyear Tire and Rubber Company, through their Cooper brand, will be the tire supplier for the series. For the 2023 season, USF Juniors plans to begin using the Tatuus JR-23 chassis, which can be upgraded for use in both U.S. F2000 and Indy Pro 2000 as drivers and teams progress through the Road to Indy ladder. The new car will also use the same MZR engine used in the Road to Indy series.

Circuits

References

External Links
 

Auto racing series in the United States
One-make series
Formula racing series
USF Juniors
Road to Indy